Quiet Desperation may refer to:

 "Quiet Desperation", a song by Marilyn Martin from This Is Serious, 1988
 "Quiet Desperation", a song by Scatman John from Scatman's World, 1995
 Quiet Desperation, an online mockumentary series by Rob Potylo